The 98th Ahir Infantry was an infantry regiment of the British Indian Army. It could trace its origins to 1788, when it was raised as the 1st Battalion of the Ellichpur Brigade for the Princely state of Hyderabad. Until 1853, the regiment was part of the Nizam of Hydrabad's Army; then, after the signing of a treaty with the then Governor General of India, the Nizam's Contingent was renamed the Hyderabad Contingent and became part of the regular Indian Army.

The regiment fought in the Battle of Mahidpur during the Third Anglo-Maratha War. It then participated in the Siege of Nowah and the later Capture of Nowah. It next took part in the Central India Campaign after the Indian Rebellion of 1857. It was sent to China in 1900, as part of the relief force during the Boxer Rebellion. During the First World War, the regiment was part of the Indian Expeditionary Force B for service in British East Africa.
 
After the First World War, the Indian government reformed the army, moving from single-battalion regiments to multi-battalion regiments. In 1922, the 98th Infantry became the 4th Battalion, 19th Hyderabad Regiment. This regiment was allocated to the Indian Army after independence.

Predecessor names
1st Battalion of the Ellichpur Brigade -  1788
7th Regiment of Infantry, Nizam's Army - 1826
5th Infantry, Hyderabad Contingent - 1854
96th Berar Infantry - 1903

References

Moberly, F.J. (1923). Official History of the War: Mesopotamia Campaign, Imperial War Museum. 

British Indian Army infantry regiments
Military units and formations established in 1788
Military units and formations disestablished in 1922
Military history of the Madras Presidency
Military units and formations of the Boxer Rebellion
Indian World War I regiments
1788 establishments in British India